Edward Foster may refer to:
Ed Foster (cricketer) (born 1985), cricketer 
Edward Foster (VC) (1886–1946), recipient of the Victoria Cross
Edward A. Foster, businessman and lumber tycoon
Edward P. Foster (1896–1962), member of the Legislative Assembly of Alberta
Ed Foster (writer) (1949–2008), columnist
Ed Foster (baseball) (1880–1929), Major League Baseball pitcher
Eddie Foster (1887–1937), baseball player
Eddie Foster (American football) (born 1954), American football player
Edward Powell Foster, creator of the constructed language Ro
Edward Foster (Canadian) from 1863 in Canada
Edward Foster, candidate in the 1959 Manitoba general election
Edward Foster (actor) from The Three Stooges Meet Hercules
Edward Foster (badminton), 2004 IBF World Junior Championships
Edward Foster (physician) from James Sims
Edward Foster (tennis) from 1957 U.S. National Championships – Men's Singles